Stewart Wilson (born 22 October 1942) is a former  international rugby union player. He played as a fullback.

He had 22 caps for Scotland between 1964 and 1968, and captained his country in four international matches. He scored 68 points in internationals for Scotland.

He was selected for the 1966 British Lions tour to Australia and New Zealand, and played in the second international against  and all four tests against the All Blacks, scoring 30 points which was a Lions career record for test match points at the time.

He represented Oxford in the Varsity Match in 1963 and 1964 and played club rugby for London Scottish.

References 

1942 births
Living people
Alumni of the University of Oxford
Barbarian F.C. players
British & Irish Lions rugby union players from Scotland
London Scottish F.C. players
Oxford University RFC players
Rugby union fullbacks
Scotland international rugby union players
Scottish rugby union players